David Harper was a Court of Appeals justice at the Supreme Court of Victoria. He is also a former President of the Victorian Chapter of the International Commission of Jurists. He attended the University of Melbourne, where he was a resident of Trinity College and Senior Student in 1965.

References

People educated at Trinity College (University of Melbourne)
Judges of the Supreme Court of Victoria
Living people
Year of birth missing (living people)